During the 2014-15 season, the Bracknell Bees participated in the semi-professional English Premier Ice Hockey League.

Standings

English Premier League

[*] Secured play-off berth. [**] EPL League Champions

English Premier Cup - Southern Division

English Premier Cup - Northern Division

Schedule and results

Preseason
The Bees new campaign got underway with a pair of 3-2 wins in challenge matches against the Swindon Wildcats.

Regular season

External links
Official Bracknell Bees website

References

Brack